Lapathus or Lapathos was a fortress in the north of ancient Thessaly, near the Vale of Tempe.

References

Populated places in ancient Thessaly
Former populated places in Greece
Histiaeotis
Lost ancient cities and towns